Tra Carson (born October 24, 1992) is a former American football running back. He played college football at Texas A&M and was signed by the Cincinnati Bengals as an undrafted free agent in 2016.

College career
Carson played three seasons for Texas A&M (2013–15) after beginning his career at Oregon (2011). He saw action in 36 games for A&M, logging 19 rushing touchdowns and 2,075 rushing yards, with 4.8 average yards per carry in 2016. He also had 41 receptions for 299 yards and one touchdown for the Aggies. He rushed for 1,165 yards (4.8 average) and seven touchdowns in 2015 being the first Aggie running back to rush for 1,000 yards in the SEC, and added 29 receptions for 183 yards and one touchdown. He capped his 2014 season with 133-yard rushing performance in the Liberty Bowl win over West Virginia. Carson sat out the 2012 season on account the NCAA transfer rules, after playing in 10 games for Oregon in 2011. He majored in recreation, parks, and tourism sciences at Texas A&M.

Professional career

Cincinnati Bengals
Carson was signed by the Cincinnati Bengals as an undrafted free agent on April 30, 2016. On September 3, 2016, he was waived by the Bengals and was signed to their practice squad the next day. He was promoted to the active roster on December 30, 2016.

On September 2, 2017, Carson was placed on injured reserve.

On September 19, 2018, Carson was waived/injured by the Bengals after suffering a hamstring injury in practice and was placed on injured reserve. He was released on September 28, 2018.

Green Bay Packers
Carson was signed to the Green Bay Packers practice squad on October 9, 2018. On October 31, 2018, he was promoted to the active roster from the practice squad. He was placed on injured reserve on December 5, 2018, with a ribs injury.

On August 31, 2019, Carson was waived by the Packers and was signed to the practice squad the next day. He was promoted to the active roster on October 5, 2019. He was waived on October 16.

Detroit Lions
On October 17, 2019, Carson was claimed off waivers by the Detroit Lions. He was placed on injured reserve on November 2, 2019, with a hamstring injury. He was released on November 8. On January 7, 2020, he signed a reserve/future contract with the Lions. He was released on April 27, 2020.

NFL career statistics

References

External links
Detroit Lions bio

Living people
1992 births
Players of American football from Texas
People from Texarkana, Texas
American football running backs
Oregon Ducks football players
Texas A&M Aggies football players
Cincinnati Bengals players
Green Bay Packers players
Detroit Lions players